The Oregon Ducks volleyball team of the Pac-12 Conference, is the intercollegiate women's volleyball team of the University of Oregon. The team plays its home games at Matthew Knight Arena, with its former arena being McArthur Court.

Program record and history
<small>

Postseason
Below is a listing of Oregon Volleyball post-season history and results.

NCAA tournament results

See also
 NCAA Division I Women's Volleyball Championship
List of NCAA Division I women's volleyball programs

References

External links